Gennady Perepada is President of One and Only Realty, Inc., a New York City based real estate brokerage firm.  He is best known for selling real estate to high-net worth foreign clients, including sales at 432 Park Avenue, 520 Park Avenue, 15 Central Park West   and many other properties throughout North America. According to Forbes among the countries his clients emanate from are the former Soviet Union, Asia, Saudi Arabia, Hong Kong and China.

Perepada grew up in Ukraine and started off as an ice cream chef in the Soviet Union. He emigrated to New York in 1990, and learned to speak English while living in the United States.

References

American people of Ukrainian descent
Businesspeople from New York City
American real estate brokers
Living people
Year of birth missing (living people)